Urmila Singh (6 August 1946 – 29 May 2018) was the former Governor of the Indian state of Himachal Pradesh. She was appointed governor on 25 January 2010.

Early life
Urmila Singh was born in Phingeshwar village in Raipur district, now located in Chhattisgarh state, into a landowning family of central India, which also produced freedom fighters and social reformers. Urmila's great-grandfather, Raja Natwar Singh (alias Lalla Shah) of Haridaypur, was a freedom fighter, who was executed by the British rulers. Some other family members were deported to serve sentences in the Andaman and Nicobar islands.

Urmila Singh was married at a young age to Virendra Bahadur Singh, Raja of Seraipally princely state in Chhattisgarh. The couple became the parents of one daughter and two sons and Urmila Singh devoted herself to the nurture of her family. Virendra Bahadur Singh became a prominent Congress party political and a member of the Madhya Pradesh Legislative Assembly, elected from the areas that his family had previously ruled for several centuries. His mother, Rani Shyam Kumari Devi, was a Member of Parliament.

Political career

In Madhya Pradesh
After the sudden early death of her husband, Urmila Singh stepped into the political arena to contest the assembly seat previously held by him. She was duly elected for several consecutive terms from the family borough to the Madhya Pradesh assembly and remained a member from 1985 to 2003.

She served as a Minister of State for Dairy Development (1993–95) and as Cabinet Minister for Social Welfare and Tribal Welfare (1998–2003). She also served as President of the MP Congress between 1996 and 1998.

In Chhattisgarh
The new state of Chhattisgarh was carved out of Madhya Pradesh in 2000, and Urmila's constituency now fell to the portion of the new state. Urmila Singh was therefore automatically a member of the first ever legislative assembly of Chhattisgarh between 2000 and 2003. The Congress party suffered a rout in both states in the 2003 assembly elections and Urmila Singh was one of the casualties. 
She lost the elections in 2008 also.

As Governor
In recognition of her services to the congress party, the congress-led central government appointed her governor of Himachal Pradesh in 2010. She took office on 25 January 2010 and completed her term on 24 January 2015, becoming the first woman governor in Himachal to do so.

Death
Urmila Singh died on 29 May 2018, aged 71. According to family sources, she had been suffering from brain-related complications. She was admitted to a private hospital where her condition remained unstable. She is survived by her two sons and a daughter.

References

External links

1946 births
2018 deaths
People from Raipur district
Governors of Himachal Pradesh
Women state governors of India
Indian National Congress politicians from Madhya Pradesh
Chhattisgarh MLAs 2000–2003
Women in Himachal Pradesh politics
Madhya Pradesh MLAs 1985–1990
Madhya Pradesh MLAs 1993–1998
Madhya Pradesh MLAs 1998–2003
20th-century Indian women politicians
20th-century Indian politicians
21st-century Indian women politicians
21st-century Indian politicians
Women members of the Madhya Pradesh Legislative Assembly
Women members of the Chhattisgarh Legislative Assembly